Ankeny is a surname. Notable people with the surname include:

Heather Ankeny, American actor
John Fletcher Ankeny (1824–1886), founder of Ankeny, Iowa
Levi Ankeny (1844–1921), United States senator for Washington
Marling J. Ankeny (d. 1977), American mining engineer
Nesmith Ankeny (1927–1993), American mathematician
Rachel Ankeny, professor of history and philosophy of science at University of Adelaide